Alexander Harris (1878 – 24 August 1952) was a Member of Parliament for the  electorate in Auckland, New Zealand.

Birth and education  
He was born in London in 1878, and educated at Dulwich College, London.

Member of Parliament

Alexander Harris represented Waitemata in the House of Representatives for 24 years from 1911 to 1935.

Independent
In July 1927, Alex Harris publicly stated that he wanted more "freedom of action" and announced that he had "no intention of attending any caucuses of the Reform Party".

Harris and his colleague, Vivian Potter, were opposed to Gordon Coates and his moves to introduce public ferries and buses to compete with private enterprise in Auckland; an approach they regarded as "socialist". In retaliation, Coates removed Harris from his position as Chairman of the Commerce Select Committee.

Notes

References

1878 births
1952 deaths
Independent MPs of New Zealand
Reform Party (New Zealand) MPs
New Zealand Liberal Party MPs
Members of the New Zealand House of Representatives
New Zealand MPs for Auckland electorates
Unsuccessful candidates in the 1935 New Zealand general election
People educated at Dulwich College
English emigrants to New Zealand